The Host may refer to:

Fictional characters
 Lorne (Angel), a character on the television series Angel
 A Marvel Comics supervillain

Literature
 The Host (Canterbury Tales), a character in Geoffrey Chaucer's The Canterbury Tales
 The Host (novel), a 2008 novel by Stephenie Meyer
 The Host, a 1991 novel by Peter Emshwiller

Films
 The Host (2006 film), a South Korean monster film by Bong Joon-ho
 The Host (2013 film), a film based on Stephenie Meyer's eponymous 2008 novel
 The Host (2020 film), a Dutch mystery thriller film

Music
 "The Host", a song by Built to Spill from Ancient Melodies of the Future (2001)

Television
 "The Host" (Star Trek: The Next Generation), the 97th episode in the television series Star Trek: The Next Generation
 "The Host" (The X-Files), an episode of the television series The X-Files

See also
Host (disambiguation)